Salam Zgharta Football Club, known as Salam Zgharta or simply Salam, is a football club based in Zgharta, Lebanon, that competes in the .

Founded in 1933 as Salam Achrafieh, the club was renamed Salam Zgharta in 1971; their supporters are mainly from the Zgharta region and other districts in North Lebanon. The club's traditional kit colours are red and black. In 2014 they won the Lebanese FA Cup, their only major trophy to date.

History

Salam Achrafieh (1933–1971)
Salam Achrafieh was a club established in Ashrafieh, a district in the northern Beirut. This club is considered one of the founders of the Lebanese Football Association, as Georges Slim represented the club in the first general assembly of the association on 22 March 1933.

In May 1933, Salam Achrafieh hosted a game against Arax and fielded a player called Spiro who wasn't living in Achrafieh. This was considered illegal at the time and the LFA disqualified Salam from the match. This decision was not welcomed by Slim, who was a well-known media personality, and tried to change the executive committee, but ended up failing as Al Nahda SC, the dominating team at the time, didn't approve of the change.

Salam Achrafieh played in the first ever Lebanese Second Division season and ended up winning the trophy after winning 2–0 against Ararad in the final game.

In 1937, Salam Achrafieh became the first ever two-times Second Division winners.

Early history (1971–1990) 
Salam Zgharta was founded in 1971, after a group of football enthusiasts bought the licence of former club Salam Achrafieh, based in the Achrafieh district of Beirut. The club's first board of administrators was elected on 15 August 1971, with Father Semaan Douaihy as the club's honorary president, and Youssef Zeidan as the executive president.

The club remained in Achrafieh until 1974, when they moved to Zgharta, in North Lebanon. They competed in the Lebanese Premier League, with Sassine Ghazale funding the club after the move. During the 1974–75 season, Antoine "Al Shakra" Fenianos was the club's first manager. Salam Zgharta's first game was at the Camille Chamoun Sports City Stadium against Nejmeh, in which Salam Zgharta lost 5–2. In their first season, the club got demoted to the second division with Riyada Wal Adab, after the early finish of the season due to start of the Lebanese Civil War.

While football in Lebanon was affected by the Civil War, the Lebanese Football Association (LFA) split into two entities, with each organizing its own competitions in the latter stage of the war. Salam Zgharta joined the Eastern Federation and won the Lebanese FA Cup on 12 April 1987, after beating Homentmen in the final (0–0, and 1–0 in the replay). However, following the war, the two federations re-merged and the FA Cup win was voided. During the war, Salam Zgharta played against numerous clubs from Syria, Cyprus, and Romania.

Post-war period (1990–2006) 

Following the end of the Civil War, Salam Zgharta were one of the best teams in the league, with a core of players such as Fawzi Yammine and Elias Bou Nassif. The start of the 1990s was positive for the Northern club, finishing third in the 1990–91 season with 35 points. Following the expansion of the Premier League to 20 teams divided into two groups, Salam Zgharta finished the 1991–92 season as second of their group and fourth in the league standing after securing 23 points in 20 games.

In 1992, Kabalan Yammine became Salam Zgharta's president. The club was not able to replicate past success; they stayed the following two seasons in the top flight but then struggled to maintain its position in the Lebanese Premier League for financial reasons. Therefore, the club regularly played in the Lebanese Second Division. In the 1999–2000 season, Salam Zgharta finished fifth in the Lebanese Premier League, their best result under the presidency of Kabalan Yammine. In 1996, Youssef Jabbour got elected vice president. In the mid-2000s, Kabalan lost interest in the club; an election took place in October 2006, three games after the start of the 2006–07 season, and Estephan Frangieh became the president.

Estephan Frangieh's presidency (2006–present) 

In the first season under Estephan Frangieh's presidency (2006–07), the club was relegated to the Second Division. Following their relegation, Frangieh invested heavily in the club and they were promoted right back into the first division in the 2007–08 season. Their stay in the first division only lasted one season as they were relegated again in the 2008–09 season. In 2009, the Merdeshiyeh Stadium was fully renovated, using donations from the fans, and was renamed Zgharta Sports Complex. Salam Zgharta also established its own academy the same year. The club eventually won the 2012–13 Lebanese Second Division after topping Group A, gaining promotion to the Premier League.

In their return to the Premier League in the 2013–14 season, Salam Zgharta hired Peter Meindertsma as their head coach. While the club struggled to avoid relegation in the league, they won the 2013–14 Lebanese FA Cup, after beating Tripoli 1–0 after extra time in the final. In 2015, Salam Zgharta participated for the first time in the AFC Cup after winning the one-legged qualifying play-off round match against Khayr Vahdat 3–0 at home. They went on to win one match, against Al-Nahda of Oman, in six games in the group stage.

In the 2016–17 season, Salam Zgharta started the campaign with a 5–2 win at home against Ansar, the league's record-title holders. Salam finished runners-up, their best ever finish to date, winning 10 games out of 11 at home. They qualified to the 2018–19 Arab Club Champions Cup for the first time, losing 3–2 on aggregate against Raja Casablanca in the round of 32. In the 2020–21 seasons, after eight consecutive seasons in the top flight, Salam Zgharta were relegated to the Second Division. They were promoted back in 2021–22, after finishing second in the Second Division.

Colors and badges
Following the move from Achrafieh to Zgharta, Salam Zgharta was known for wearing blue at home and white away. After the re-merging of the LFA in 1990, Salam Zgharta opted to change their home colours to red.

The first ever logo of Salam Zgharta was designed in 1971 by artist Pierre Farchakh. It consisted of a circle with the words "Al Salam Zgharta" written in a calligraphic form to take the shape of a pigeon. The design was then changed in 2010, which conserved the round shape. The logo consisted of a circle on top of a bigger circle: the bigger circle was divided in two halves, the top half black with the word "SALAM" is written in white, while the bottom half red with the word "ZGHARTA" also written in white. The smaller circle was made of a football on top of a pigeon, with red underneath the pigeon. The logo was then re-modernized in 2016 by graphic designer Alberto Nakad.

Stadium
Salam Zgharta owns the Zgharta Sports Complex. The stadium is located in the Merdeshiyeh region in Zgharta and currently it can host almost 5,500 people. The stadium was built by the Maronite endowment next to the Sarkis and Bakhos Church, and it was renovated in 2009 using the donations of the club's fans in Zgharta. The same year, the endowment gave the right of usage of the stadium to Salam Zgharta. Other than the football pitch, the complex contains an outdoor basketball court, futsal court, headquarters of the club, cafeteria, gym and a number of studios for the players coming from outside of Zgharta.

The stadium faced a ban from the federation in 1999, which was lifted in 2009.

Supporters
Salam Zgharta supporters are mainly located in the Zgharta and nearby districts. They were known to cause some troubles during matches in the 1990s and 2000s.

Club rivalries
Salam Zgharta plays the North derby with Tripoli, as they are both located in the same area. Other minor rivalries take place with clubs like Ansar Howara SC and Egtmaaey but Salam Zgharta don't face them much anymore as they are not regular visitors to the first division. The first derby between Salam Zgharta and Tripoli was played on 18 December 2005, at the Rachid Karame Municipality Stadium. The home team, Salam Zgharta, won the game 1–0 after a goal from Wehbe Douaihy at the 58th minute.

Reserve team 
In the 2014–15 season, Salam Zgharta's administration bought a Second Division club called "Al Oummal Tripoli", alongside the contract of Mostafa Matar and Oussama Najjar, for a fee of $120,000. The club was renamed Amal Al Salam Zgharta, and is used as a reserve team in which all academy graduates play to get experience.

Players

Current squad

Notable players

Presidential history

Managerial history

Honours 
 Lebanese FA Cup
Winners (1): 2013–14
Lebanese Second Division
 Winners (6): 1933–34, 1936–37, 1997–98, 2004–05, 2007–08, 2012–13 (group A)
Lebanese Federation Cup
Runners-up (1): 1999
Lebanese Challenge Cup
Runners-up (2): 2016, 2019
Lebanese Super Cup
Runners-up (1): 2014

Performance in AFC competitions
 AFC Cup: 1 appearance
 2015: Group stage

See also
 List of football clubs in Lebanon

Notes

References

External links

 
 Salam Zgharta FC at the AFC
 Salam Zgharta FC at FA Lebanon

 
Football clubs in Lebanon
1933 establishments in Lebanon
1971 establishments in Lebanon
Association football clubs established in 1933
Association football clubs established in 1971